Tyrolean grey cheese (Tiroler Graukäse) is a strongly flavoured, rennet-free cows-milk acid-curd cheese made in the Tyrolean Alp valleys, Austria. It owes its name to the grey mold that usually grows on its rind. It is extremely low in fat (around 0.5%) and it has a powerful penetrating smell.
The cheese produced in Austria is registered as protected designation of origin (PDO), Austria generally indicated in German as g.U. (geschützte Ursprungsbezeichnung) under the official name Tiroler Graukäse The registration of the PDO states that its production has been a significant element of Tyrolean peasant gastronomy for centuries. Graukäse produced in Italy is protected by a prodotto agroalimentare tradizionale (PAT) designation. Graukäse making became widespread on farms due to the simplicity of making and the availability of low-fat milk after the fat had been taken for use in butter making.

See also
 List of cheeses

References

Cow's-milk cheeses
Acid-set cheeses
Austrian cheeses
Austrian products with protected designation of origin
Cheeses with designation of origin protected in the European Union
Italian cheeses